Volyně is a town in Strakonice District in the South Bohemian Region of the Czech Republic. It has about 3,000 inhabitants. The town centre is well preserved and is protected by law as an urban monument zone.

Administrative parts
Villages of Černětice, Račí, Starov and Zechovice are administrative parts of Volyně. Černětice and Račí form an exclave of the municipal territory.

Etymology
The origin of the name Volyně is unknown. There are hypotheses that it was derived from a Slavic tribe which came from the area of today's Ukraine.

Geography
It lies in the Bohemian Forest Foothills. The river Volyňka, named after Volyně, flows through the town.

History
According to archaeological findings, a Slavic settlement was built on the site of today's town in the 7th century. The first written mention of Volyně is from 1271, when a gord was documented here. In 1299, the settlement was promoted to a town. In 1327, the parish church and town fortifications were completed. In the 15th century, the Volyně waged a long-standing and ultimately victorious dispute with the royal town of Písek over the import of salt and the payment of tolls. The town's prosperity peaked before the Thirty Years' War.

During the war, Volyně suffered from looting, fires and passage of troops. After the war, despite several fires and plague epidemics, the town continued to grow and spread beyond the town walls. The face of the town changed significantly in the 19th century, when the square was paved and new multi-story buildings began to be built.

Demographics

Education
The town is known as a local centre of education. Apart from preschool education and a primary/secondary school, there is Higher Vocational School and Secondary Industrial School. It was founded in 1864.

Sights

The historic town centre is formed by Svobody Square and adjacent streets. The main landmark of the square is the Renaissance town hall, built between 1521 and 1529. Other historical buildings include Gothic fortress from the 14th century, Church of All Saints from same period, Church of the Transfiguration, which was built between 1580 and 1618, and Jewish synagogue that dates from 1939. A Marian column located in the middle of the town square dates from 1760.

Notable people
Josef Niklas (1817–1877), architect
Josef Kaizl (1854–1901), economist and politician
Jan Rubeš (1920–2009), opera singer and actor

Twin towns – sister cities

Volyně is twinned with:
 Aidenbach, Germany
 Kováčová, Slovakia

References

External links

Cities and towns in the Czech Republic
Populated places in Strakonice District
Prácheňsko